Christian Galan (born in 1960) is a French Japanologist and professor of Japanese language and civilization at Toulouse-Jean-Jaurès University (formerly Toulouse-le Mirail) and a researcher at the Japanese Studies Center (CEJ) of the National Institute for Oriental Languages and Civilizations (Inalco, Paris). He has devoted most of his work to the study of the Japanese education system.

Within the CEJ, he directs the research group "Education, Childhood and Society in Contemporary Japan" and co-directs with Emmanuel Lozerand the research group "Speech and debates of the Meiji era". He is also director of the Toulouse branch of the CEJ, co-director with Emmanuel Lozerand of the "Japan" Collection at Belles-Lettres Editions and, since 2010, is in charge of a general inspection mission for teaching Japanese in France for the Ministry of National Education.

Biography 
A graduate of the Ecole Normale in Toulouse (1982), Christian Galan has a doctoral dissertation in Japanese Studies at Inalco (1997) and holds the Habilitation to supervise research (2006). His current teaching at the University of Toulouse-Jean-Jaurès focuses on language as well as Japanese history and society.

His fields of research mainly concern the study of the Japanese educational system in its various dimensions, historical and educational in particular. His career as a researcher has been organized around six major axes to which his various publications are attached: the teaching of reading in Japan: history, politics and pedagogy; the Japanese writing system and the question of illiteracy; teaching Japanese in France and in Europe: policy and research on pedagogy; the history of the Japanese education system: a shift from Edo era education to education in the Meiji era, a chronology of the history of education, and a study of some pivotal times, transfers of knowledge to do in education between Japan and China, etc. ; current reforms of the Japanese education system, including universities; the history of childhood and young people in Japan.

Main publications (books and book directions) 
In a statistical overview of Christian Galan's writings, WorldCat lists about 22 works in 57 publications in 3 languages in more than 580 library collections

 Christian Galan, L’Enseignement de la lecture au Japon – Politique et Éducation, Toulouse, PUM, 2001 (in French)
 Christian Galan and Christine Nguyen Tri (dir. by), " Aspects de la modernité à l’aube du XXème siècle : l’éducation en Chine et au Japon ", Daruma – Revue internationale d’études japonaises, n° 12/13, automne 2002/printemps 2003] (in French)
 Christian Galan, Introduction à l’écriture japonaise, CD-Rom didacticiel (présentation de l’écrit japonais et exercices d’apprentissage des kana), Toulouse, Université du Mirail, 2003 (in French)
 Christian Galan and Jacques Fijalkow (dir. by), Langue, lecture et école au Japon, Arles, Philippe Picquier, 2006 (in French)
 Christian Galan, J’apprends le japonais, illustrations de Florence Lérot-Calvo, Arles, Philippe Picquier, 2007 (in French)
 Christian Galan and Arnaud Brotons (dir. by), Japon pluriel 7, Philippe Picquier, 2008 (in French)
 Anne Gonon and Christian Galan (dir. by), Le Monde comme horizon – État des sciences humaines et sociales au Japon, Arles, Philippe Picquier, 2009 (in French)
 Patrick Heinrich and Christian Galan (dir. by), Language Life in Japan : Transformations and Prospects, Abingdon, Routledge, 2010.
 Christian Galan, I’m Learning Japanese, illustrations by Florence Lérot-Calvo, New York, Tuttle Publishing, 2010.
 Christian Galan and Emmanuel Lozerand (dir. by), La Famille japonaise moderne (1868–1926) – Discours et débats, Arles, Philippe Picquier, 2011 (in French)
 Christian Galan and Claude Lévi Alvarès (dir. by), Dossiers des Sciences de l’Education, n° 27, " Séisme éducatif au Japon ", mars 2012 (in French)
 Christian Galan and Jean-Pierre Giraud (dir. by), Individu-s et démocratie au Japon, Toulouse, PUM, " Tempus Histoire ", 2015(in French)
 Christian Galan and Rémi Scoccimarro (dir. by), " Trois ans avec Fukushima ", Cahiers d’histoire immédiate, n° 47, mai 2015 (in French)
 Christian Galan and Jean-Marc Olivier (dir. by), Histoire du Japon & Histoire au Japon, Toulouse, Privat, 2016 (in French)
 Fukuzawa Yukichi, L’Appel à l’étude, édition complète, traduit du japonais, annoté et présenté par Christian Galan, Paris, Les Belles Lettres, avril 2018, 220 p. (in French)
 Christian Galan and Patrick Heinrich (dir. by), Being Young in Super-Aging Japan: Formative Events and Cultural Reactions, Routledge, 2018

References 

Academic staff of the University of Toulouse
French Japanologists
1960 births
Living people